Overseas Indonesians are people of Indonesian birth or descent who live outside of Indonesia. As of 2021, there are about 9 million overseas Indonesians globally, 5.3 million undocumented overseas Indonesian workers, 4.7 million overseas Indonesian officially, and 3.254 million overseas Indonesian legal workers.

History 

Since ancient times, people from various ethnic groups of Indonesia have been leaving their hometowns to other parts of the world for purposes of trade, education, labor, or travel. During the colonial era, many Indonesians were sent for enslavement by the Dutch East Indies to their other colonies such as Suriname and New Caledonia, while political dissidents against Dutch colonization were sent to South Africa from Indonesia during the 18th century, forming a group known as Cape Malays. Some ethnic groups outside of Indonesia also have Indonesian ancestry; for example, the Malagasy people are descended from Borneo seafarers who traveled to Madagascar from the Malay Archipelago in the 7th and 8th centuries during the peak of the maritime Srivijaya empire.

Merantau 
The practice of going abroad has been motivated by the Merantau culture of the Indonesian people since ancient times. Merantau has been associated deeply with the Minangkabau people as a cultural way of life. A Minangkabau man at the time of young adulthood (20–30 years old) is often encouraged to go abroad as part of the Minangkabau culture; this serves as a sign of manhood to accrue wealth, knowledge, and life experience. This practice can be traced to the 7th century, when Minangkabau merchants played a major role in establishing of the Malay kingdom in Jambi, which was a strategic position for trade via the Silk Road.

Other Indonesian ethnic groups such as the Bugis, Banjar, Madura, Aceh, Batak, and Javanese have also been traveling overseas to gain opportunities, experience, knowledge, and versatility.

Indonesians worldwide

Australia 

Before Dutch and British sailors arrived in Australia, Indonesians from Southern Sulawesi have explored the Australia northern coast. Each year, the Bugis sailors would sail down on the northwestern monsoon in their wooden pinisi. They would stay in Australia for several months to trade and take tripang (or dried sea cucumber) before returning to Makassar on the dry season off shore winds. These trading voyages continued until 1907.
Nowadays, many Indonesian residents of Australia are either foreign students or workers, with a large number being of Chinese Indonesian heritage.
Furthermore, the Cocos Malays are descendants of native Indonesians were brought by the Clunies-Ross family to work in the copra industry in the 19th century.

Hong Kong 

Indonesians are the second largest foreigner group after Filipinos, mainly working as female domestic helpers from Java Island. There are also several Chinese Indonesian families and students that reside in Hong Kong. Central and Wan Chai are the main districts that most Indonesians live in.

Japan 

In 2013, approximately 20,000 Indonesians lived in Japan, including about 3,000 illegal Indonesians. These numbers dropped from the previous years for various reasons, including the high cost of living in Japan and the difficulty of finding jobs in Japan. Most of them are in Japan for a short term and deportation remains high for Indonesian residents.

Malaysia 

Malaysia shares a land border with Indonesia and both countries share many aspects of their culture, including mutually intelligible national languages. Populations have long moved between the areas which make up the modern-day states. Since the distinction between the two regions emerged in the early 19th century, many people from Java, Kalimantan, Sumatra, and Sulawesi, which are located in modern-day Indonesia, migrated and settled in the Malay Peninsula and in Malaysian Borneo. These earlier populations have mostly effectively or partially assimilated with the larger Malaysian-Malay community due to religious, social and cultural similarities. Currently, it is also estimated that there are around 2 million Indonesian citizens in Malaysia at any given time, ranging from all types of backgrounds including a significant majority of labour migrants alongside a considerable number of professionals and students.

Netherlands 

Indonesia was a colony of the Netherlands from 1605 until 1942. In the early 20th century, many Indonesian students studied in the Netherlands. Most of them lived in Leiden and were active in the Perhimpoenan Indonesia (Indonesian Association). During and after the Indonesian National Revolution, many Moluccans and Indo people, people of mixed Dutch and Indonesian ancestry migrated to the Netherlands. Most of them were former members of the KNIL army. In this way, around 360,000 Indo people and Totoks (white people) and 12,500 persons from Maluke ancestry were settled in the Netherlands. Giovanni van Bronckhorst, Denny Landzaat, Roy Makaay, Mia Audina, and Daniel Sahuleka are notable people of Indonesian ancestry from the Netherlands. These 372,500 first generation people and their 2nd, 3rd and 4th generation offspring account for some 1.6 million Dutch passport-holders and form as much as 10% of the overall population of the Netherlands.

Philippines 

Indonesians in the Philippines number anywhere from 43,871 to 101,720. They reside mostly in the island of Mindanao, in the Muslim parts with a noticeable community in Davao City that has an international school for the overseas community. They tend to be protective of their separate ethnic identity. Most are Muslims, while many others are also Christian, coming from Minahasan-speaking ancestry.

Qatar 
There are about 39,000 Indonesian citizens in the State of Qatar according to the Indonesian Embassy.

Saudi Arabia 

Indonesian pilgrims have long lived in Hejaz, a region along the west coast of Saudi Arabia. Among them was Shaykh Ahmad Khatib Al-Minangkabawi who was from Minangkabau origin in Sumatra. He served as the Imam and taught at the Shafi'i school at the Grand Mosque in Mecca during the late 19th century.

Many Indonesians in Saudi Arabia are domestic workers, with a minority of other types of labour migrants and students. Most of the santris (Islamic boarding school pupils) from Indonesia also have continued to pursue their education in Saudi, such as in the Islamic University of Madinah and the Umm al-Qura University in Mecca. A number of Indonesian expatriates in Saudi Arabia work in diplomatic sectors and local private and foreign companies, such as in the Saudi Aramco, banking companies, Saudia Airlines, SABIC, Schlumberger, Halliburton, Indomie, etc. Most Indonesians in Saudi Arabia reside in Riyadh, Jeddah, and all around the Dammam area.

Saudis of Indonesian descent 
There are Saudi citizens who reside in Mecca and Jeddah that are of Indonesian descent. Their forefathers came from Indonesia by sea during the late 19th century til the mid 20th century for pilgrimage, trade, and Islamic education purposes. Many of them did not return to their homeland thus they decided to stay in Saudi and their descendants have become Saudi citizens ever since. Many of them also married with local Arab women and stayed permanently in Saudi. Their descendants today are recognizable with their family name originating from their forefathers' origins back in Indonesia, such as "Bugis", "Banjar", "Batawi" (Betawi), "Al-Felemban" (Palembang), "Faden" (Padang), "Al-Bantani" (Banten), "Al-Minangkabawi" (Minangkabau), "Bawayan" (Bawean), and many more. One of them is Muhammad Saleh Benten, a Saudi politician appointed by King Salman as the Minister of Hajj and Umrah.

Singapore 

The Malays in Singapore (Malay: Orang Melayu Singapura) make up about 14% of the country's population. Most of them came from what we know today as  Indonesia and southern Malaysia. In the 19th century, Singapore was part of Johor-Riau Sultanate. Many Indonesian people, mainly Bugis and Minangkabau settled in Singapore. From 1886 till 1890, as many as 21,000 Javanese became bonded labourers with the Singapore Chinese Protectorate, an organisation formed by the British in 1877 to monitor the Chinese population. They performed manual labour in the rubber plantations. After their bond ended, they continued to open up the land and stayed on in Johore. Famous Singaporeans of Indonesian descent are the first president of Singapore Yusof bin Ishak, and Zubir Said who composed the national anthem of Singapore Majulah Singapura.

According to the Indonesian Embassy in Singapore, as of 2010 there are 180,000 Indonesian citizens in Singapore. As much as 80,000 work as domestic helpers/TKI, 10,000 as sailors, and the rest are either students or professionals. But the number can be higher as registering one's residence is not compulsory for Indonesians, putting the number to around 200,000 people.

South Africa

South Korea

Suriname 

People of Indonesian descent, mainly Javanese, make up 15% of the population of Suriname. In the 19th century, the Dutch sent the Javanese to Suriname as indentured laborers in plantations. The most famous person of Indonesian descent is Paul Somohardjo as the speaker of the National Assembly of Suriname.

Taiwan

United Arab Emirates

United Kingdom

United States 

The United States is home to many Indonesian students and professionals. In the Silicon Valley region of Northern California, there are many professional Indonesian-American engineers in the technology industry who are employed in companies like Cisco Systems, KLA Tencor, Google, Yahoo, Sun Microsystems, and IBM. Sehat Sutardja, the CEO of Marvell Technology Group, is a prominent Indonesian professional in the USA.

In April 2011, the Special English service of Voice of America reported on a push for American universities to attract more Indonesians to study in America in order to compete with students' preferred universities in Australia, Singapore, and Malaysia.

List of Indonesian diaspora by ethnicity and culture 
 Overseas Acehnese
 Overseas Javanese
 Overseas Minangkabau
 Overseas Malays
 Overseas Moluccan

See also 

 Cape Malays
 Sri Lankan Malays
 Cocos Malays
 Indonesian migrant worker
 Malagasy people

References

Indonesian diaspora
Society of Indonesia
Indonesian people